United States Numbered Highways in Oklahoma are part of a nationwide network of roadways passing through the 48 contiguous states. These U.S. Highways are the second-highest category of road classifications in the Oklahoma road system, just below the Interstate Highways. U.S. Highways are marked with a number contained inside a white shield in a black box. The number is generally even if the highway runs east–west, and generally odd if it runs north–south, though there are many substantial deviations from this plan.


Mainline highways

Special routes

References

External links
OKHighways by Eric Stuve

U.S. Highways